The Mashantucket Pequot Tribal Nation is a federally recognized American Indian tribe in the state of Connecticut. They are descended from the Pequot people, an Algonquian-language tribe that dominated the southern New England coastal areas, and they own and operate Foxwoods Resort Casino within their reservation in Ledyard, Connecticut. As of 2018, Foxwoods Resort Casino is one of the largest casinos in the world in terms of square footage, casino floor size, and number of slot machines, and it was one of the most economically successful in the United States until 2007, but it became deeply in debt by 2012 due to its expansion and changing conditions.

The tribe was federally recognized in 1983 through the Mashantucket Pequot Land Claims Settlement Act.  The federal land claims suit was brought by the tribe against the State of Connecticut and the Federal government, charging that the tribe had been illegally deprived of its land through state actions that were not ratified by the Senate. As part of the settlement of this suit, Congress gave federal recognition to the tribe, in addition to approving financial compensation so that the tribe could repurchase lost land. Tribal membership is based on proven lineal descent of 11 Pequot families whose ancestors were listed in the 1900 US Census.

The Mashantucket Pequot tribe is one of two federally recognized tribes in Connecticut, the other being the Mohegan Indian Tribe.

Geography
The Mashantucket Pequot Indian Reservation is located in Mashantucket, Connecticut, in southeastern Connecticut's New London County near the Thames River. It is held in trust for the tribe by the Bureau of Indian Affairs (BIA). The tribe also owns land in the adjacent towns of Ledyard, Preston and North Stonington, as well as in New London.

Demographics and membership

Today, the Mashantucket Pequot population consists of more than 1100 enrolled members. As a federally recognized tribe, the Mashantucket Pequots have the authority to determine their membership criteria. The tribe requires its members to be of proven lineal descent from 11 Mashantucket Pequot ancestors listed in the U.S. censuses of 1900 and 1910.  In 1996, the tribal membership voted to close enrollment, with the exception of children born to currently enrolled tribal members.

The 2000 census showed a resident population of 325 persons living on reservation land, 227 of whom identified themselves as American Indian, while others identify themselves as having more than one ethnicity, including non-Pequot spouses.  Since that time, the tribe expanded reservation housing, and members continue to relocate to the reservation as housing becomes available.

Government

As of 2020, the Mashantucket Pequot Elders Council officers are:

Chair—Marjorie Colebut-Jackson
Vice-Chair— Shirley "Laughing Woman" Patrick
Secretary/Treasurer-Anthony Sebastian

The seven members of the Mashantucket Pequot Tribal Council are:
Chair—Rodney A. Butler
Vice-Chair—Latoya Cluff
Secretary—Matthew Pearson 
Treasurer— Merrill Reels
Councilor—Daniel Menihan 
Councilor—Crystal Whipple
Councilor—Richard E. Sebastian

The current administration's seven-member council has stated that the tribe's priorities are protecting tribal sovereignty, focusing on the educational, emotional, and physical well-being of members, and working to leverage the tribe's financial and economic strengths through partnership initiatives, both locally and abroad. Mashantucket Pequot's local investments include the Lake of Isles golf course and the Spa at Norwich Inn, both of which have proven to be positive additions to local municipal tax bases.

Council members are elected by popular vote of the tribal membership to three-year, staggered terms. There are roughly 600 eligible voting members of the tribe, which numbered 1086 in 2018. Tribal Members must be at least 18 years old and in good standing with the tribe to be eligible to vote.

Chairman
Richard Arthur Hayward (1975–1998)
Kenneth M. Reels (1998–2003)
Michael Thomas (2003–2009)
Rodney Butler (2010–present)

Economy
The Mashantucket Pequots have owned and operated one of the largest resort casinos in the world since 1992. The University of Connecticut analyzed the Foxwoods casino's effects on the Connecticut economy, and their report stated that it had a positive economic impact on the neighboring towns of Ledyard, Preston, and North Stonington, as well as the state of Connecticut, which has received more than $4 billion in slot revenue.

History
The Mashantucket Pequots are descendants of the historic Pequot tribe, an Algonquian-speaking people who dominated the coastal area from the Niantic River of Connecticut east to the Pawcatuck River which forms a border with Rhode Island, and south to Long Island Sound. A second descendant group is the Eastern Pequot Tribal Nation, which is not recognized by the Federal government.

During the colonial years, colonists recorded inter-tribal warfare, shifts in boundaries, and changes in power among the tribes. Scholars believe that the Pequots migrated from the upper Hudson River Valley into central and eastern Connecticut around 1500. William Hubbard wrote Narrative of the Troubles with the Indians in New-England in 1667 to explore the ferocity with which the Pequot tribe had attacked the colonists. He described them as invaders from "the interior of the continent" who "by force seized upon one of the places near the sea, and became a Terror to all their Neighbors." Contemporary scholars suggest that archaeological, linguistic, and documentary evidence show that the Pequots were indigenous for centuries in the Connecticut Valley before the arrival of settlers.

By the time that Plymouth Colony and the Massachusetts Bay colony were being established, the Pequots had established military dominance among Indian tribes in central and eastern Connecticut. They numbered some 16,000 in the most densely inhabited portion of southern New England. The smallpox epidemic of 1616–19 killed roughly 90-percent of the Indians on the eastern coast of New England, but it failed to reach the Pequot, Niantic and Narragansett tribes, and this assisted the Pequots in their rise to dominance. But the Massachusetts smallpox epidemic in 1633 devastated the region's Indian population, and historians estimate that the Pequots suffered the loss of 80-percent of their entire population. By the outbreak of the Pequot War in 1637, their numbers may have been reduced to about 3,000 in total.

Pequot War

In 1637, Connecticut and Massachusetts Bay colonies overwhelmed the Pequots during the Pequot War.  This followed the Indians' attack on Wethersfield, Connecticut that left several settlers dead. The military force of the two colonies was led by John Mason and John Underhill, and they launched an assault on the Pequot stronghold at Mystic, Connecticut, killing a significant portion of the Pequot population.

The colonists enslaved some of the surviving Pequots, sending some to the West Indies as labor on sugar cane plantations, putting others to indentured servitude as household servants in New England. Most of the survivors, however, were transferred to the Mohegan and Narragansett tribes. A few Pequots returned to the reservation years later, and they intermarried with the colonists. Many of the Pequot descendants, while multi-racial, retained a sense of culture and continuity.

Present day
The Mashantucket Pequot reservation was created by the Connecticut Colony in 1666, but only 13 people lived on the reservation by the time of the 1910 United States Census. Elizabeth George (1894–1973) was one of the last Pequot living on the reservation and, when she died in 1973, the federal government started planning to reclaim the land which they presumed would be vacated upon the deaths of the last remaining Pequot residents.

Richard "Skip" Hayward, a grandson of Elizabeth George, led the Tribe's efforts in filing a federal land claims suit against the state of Connecticut which challenged the state's sale of 800 acres of reservation lands—an event which had occurred more than 100 years earlier in 1855. The State of Connecticut agreed with the Tribe, and the US Department of Justice entered the suit, as it dealt with Federal issues and the legality of the state action.

On October 18, 1983, President Ronald Reagan signed the Connecticut Indian Land Claims Settlement Act which included Federal recognition of the Mashantucket Pequot tribe. They were the eighth American Indian tribe to gain Federal recognition through an act of Congress rather than through the administrative process of the Bureau of Indian Affairs (BIA) and Department of Interior. The Mashantucket Pequots have since added to their land holdings by purchase and placed the additional lands into trust with the BIA on behalf of the tribe.

In 1994 it purchased, and later developed further, what is now known as The Spa at Norwich Inn in Norwich, Connecticut.

Controversies
The Bureau of Indian Affairs had established criteria by which tribes seeking recognition had to document cultural and community continuity, a political organization, and related factors. Among the criteria are having to prove continuous existence as a recognized community since 1900, with internal government and tribal rules for membership.

In 1993, Donald Trump said that the owners of Foxwoods casino "did not look like real Indians." He became a key investor with the Paucatuck Eastern Pequots who were seeking federal recognition.

In his book Without Reservation: The Making of America's Most Powerful Indian Tribe and Foxwoods the World's Largest Casino (2001), Jeff Benedict argues that the Mashantuckets are not descended from the historical Pequot tribe, but rather from the Narragansett tribe.  Spokesmen for the Pequots denounced the book and asserted that Benedict's genealogical research was inherently flawed, as it failed to reflect the correct descendant lineages for the Mashantucket Pequot people identified on the 1900 and 1910 US Censuses. Laurence Hauptman argued with Benedict's assertions on the genealogy of current members, and anthropologist Katherine A. Spilde also criticized it.

In 2002, the Eastern Pequot Tribal Nation of North Stonington, Connecticut briefly gained federal recognition, as did the Schaghticoke Tribal Nation in 2004. The State of Connecticut challenged these approvals, however, and the Bureau of Indian Affairs revoked recognition of both in 2005. It was the first time since the 1970s that the agency had terminated any federally recognized tribe.

Tribal membership rules
The Mashantucket Pequot tribe receives numerous requests from individuals applying for admission as members. They base tribal membership on an individual proving descent, by recognized genealogical documentation, from one or more members of eleven families included on the 1900 US census of the tribe.

Each federally recognized tribe has the authority to set its own membership/citizenship rules. Their descent rules are similar to the Cherokee Nation's reliance on proven direct descent from those Cherokee listed in the early 20th-century Dawes Rolls. CBS News reported in May 2000 that the tribal membership had voted to drop the requirement that tribal applicants have a minimum percentage of Mashantucket Pequot blood. However, the tribe has since begun to require genetic testing of newborn children whose parents are tribal members, to establish maternity and paternity.

Foxwoods

In 1986, Skip Hayward and financial backers built a high-stakes bingo hall on reservation land, and later they added other facilities. In 1992, the Mashantucket Pequots opened Foxwoods casino, which is now one of the largest casinos in the world. Adjacent to Foxwoods is the Mashantucket Pequot Museum and Research Center which interprets Pequot history and culture. The museum hosts local and international indigenous artists and musicians, as well as mounting changing exhibits of artifacts throughout the year.

See also

 Connecticut Indian Land Claims Settlement
 Foxwoods Resort Casino
 Indian gaming
 Indian Gaming Regulatory Act
 Mashantucket Pequot Reservation Archeological District, a U.S. National Historic Landmark
 Wetu

References

Further reading

Primary sources

Hubbard, William. The History of the Indian Wars in New England 2 vols. (Boston: Samuel G. Drake, 1845).
Mason, John. A Brief History of the Pequot War: Especially of the Memorable taking of their Fort at Mistick in Connecticut in 1637/Written by Major John Mason, a principal actor therein, as then chief captain and commander of Connecticut forces; With an introduction and some explanatory notes by the Reverend Mr. Thomas Prince (Boston: Printed & sold by. S. Kneeland & T. Green in Queen Street, 1736).
Mather, Increase. A Relation of the Troubles which have Hapned in New-England, by Reason of the Indians There, from the Year 1614 to the Year 1675 (New York: Arno Press, [1676] 1972).
Underhill, John. Nevves from America; or, A New and Experimentall Discoverie of New England: Containing, a True Relation of their War-like Proceedings these two yeares last past, with a figure of the Indian fort, or Palizado.  Also a discovery of these places, that as yet have very few or no inhabitants which would yeeld special accommodation to such as will plant there . . . By Captaine Iohn Underhill, a commander in the warres there (London: Printed by I. D[awson] for Peter Cole, and are to be sold at the signe of the Glove in Corne-hill neere the Royall Exchange, 1638).
Mashantucket Pequot Reservation and Off-Reservation Trust Land, Connecticut United States Census Bureau
Vincent, Philip. A True Relation of the late Battell fought in New England, between the English, and the Salvages: With the present state of things there (London: Printed by M[armaduke] P[arsons] for Nathanael Butter, and Iohn Bellamie, 1637).

Secondary sources

Benedict, Jeff. Without Reservation: How a Controversial Indian Tribe Rose to Power and Built the World's Largest Casino (New York, NY: Perennial, 2001).
Review: Without Reservation, Indian Gaming
Boissevain, Ethel. "Whatever Became of the New England Indians Shipped to Bermuda to be Sold as Slaves," Man in the Northwest 11 (Spring 1981), pp. 103–114.
Cave, Alfred A. "The Pequot Invasion of Southern New England: A Reassessment of the Evidence", New England Quarterly 62 (1989): 27–44.
Cave, Alfred A. The Pequot War (Amherst, MA: University of Massachusetts Press, 1996).
Eisler, Kim Isaac. Revenge of the Pequots: How a Small Native American Tribe Created the World's Most Profitable Casino (New York, NY: Simon & Schuster, 2001).
Fromson, Brett Duval. Hitting the Jackpot: The Inside Story of the Richest Indian Tribe in History (New York, NY: Atlantic Monthly Press, 2003).
Hauptman, Laurence M. & James D. Wherry, eds. The Pequots in Southern New England: The Fall and Rise of an American Indian Nation  (Norman: University of Oklahoma Press, 1993).
McBride, Kevin. "The Historical Archaeology of the Mashantucket Pequots, 1637–1900", in Laurence M. Hauptman and James Wherry, eds. Pequots in Southern New England: The Fall and Rise of an American Indian Nation (Norman: University of Oklahoma Press, 1993), pp. 96–116.
McBride, Kevin. "Prehistory of the Lower Connecticut Valley" (Ph.D. diss., University of Connecticut, 1984).
https://books.google.com/books/about/Facing_East_from_Indian_Country.html?id=NXCxAl75LfIC[ Richter, Daniel K. Facing East from Indian Country: A Native History of Early America], (Cambridge, MA: Harvard University Press, 2001).
Simmons, William S. Spirit of the New England Tribes: Indian History and Folklore, 1620–1984 (Dartmouth, NH: University Press of New England, 1986).
Spiero, Arthur E., and Bruce E. Speiss. "New England Pandemic of 1616–1622: Cause and Archaeological Implication," Man in the Northeast, 35 (1987): 71–83.
Vaughan, Alden T. "Pequots and Puritans: The Causes of the War of 1637", William and Mary Quarterly 3rd Ser., Vol. 21, No. 2 (April 1964), pp. 256–269; also republished in Roots of American Racism: Essays on the Colonial Experience'' (New York: Oxford University Press, 1995).

External links
 Map of the Mashantucket Pequot Reservation, 2009, US Census Bureau
"The Pequot", Foxwoods
Connecticut Indian Land Claims Settlement, Pub. L. No. 98-134, 97 Stat. 851 (codified at 25 U.S.C. §§ 1751–60), 1983
Pequot History, Dick Shovel
National Indian Gaming Association (NIGA)

Native American tribes in Connecticut
American Indian reservations in Connecticut
Algonquian ethnonyms
Algonquian peoples
Pequot